Piña is a fiber made from the leaves of a pineapple.

Piña is also a Spanish word for:
 pineapple
 pinecone

Piña may also refer to:

People
 Aarón Piña Mora (1914–2009), Mexican painter
 Dulce Piña (born 1966), Dominican Republic judoka
 Horacio Piña (born 1945), Mexican baseball player
 John Piña Craven (1924-2015), United States Navy officer
 Jonathan Piña (born 1989), Mexican footballer
 José Piña (born 1996), Venezuelan footballer
 Laura Fernández Piña (born 1971), Mexican politician
 Manny Piña (born 1987), Venezuelan baseball player
 Mariano Piña Olaya (born 1933), Mexican politician

Places 

 Piña, Colón, an administrative division in Panama
 Elías Piña Province, in Dominican Republic
 Piña de Campos, town in Castile, Spain
 Piña de Esgueva, town in Castile, Spain

Other uses
 The fruit of the blue agave used in the production of tequila
 Piña colada, a cocktail

See also
 Pina (disambiguation)
 Pinas (disambiguation)
 Pena (disambiguation)
 Peña (disambiguation)